Peglio may refer to:

Places
Italy
 Peglio, Lombardy, a comune in the Province of Como
 Peglio, Marche a comune in the Province of Pesaro e Urbino